Maria Georgina Perez-de Venecia (born February 15, 1949), also known as Gina de Venecia, is a member of the Philippine House of Representatives for the 4th district of Pangasinan. She is the wife of Jose de Venecia, Jr., Speaker of the House of Representatives of the Philippines from 1992 to 1998 and 2001 to 2008.

Early life
De Venecia's father, the late Jose Perez, was the owner of movie production company Sampaguita Pictures, while her mother, Azucena Vera-Perez of Catanduanes, is currently the president of Sampaguita Pictures and Vera-Perez Pictures.

She finished high school at the Assumption Convent, and a degree in Business Administration at Pace College, New York. Immediately after graduation, she served as Vice President and Comptroller of Sampaguita Pictures, VP Enterprises and Jose Vera Corporation.

Public service
In 1992 she became the President and Chairperson of the Congressional Spouses Foundation, Inc. (CSFI). During her first two terms as CSFI president she established The Haven for Women in Alabang. It was inaugurated on September 30, 1995, and immediately followed by the construction of the 15 regional centers nationwide.

On February 15, 1997, de Venecia also signed a Memorandum of Agreement with then DILG Secretary Robert Barbers that prepared the setting-up of Women’s and Children’s Desk in every police station in the country.

In June 1996, she launched her radio program Pira-pirasong Pangarap. The following year, its TV version made its debut on GMA 7. After seven years, the program was re-launched as Nagmamahal, Manay Gina in the tri-media: DZBB, Balita and GMA Network. Her radio program  won three Catholic Mass Media trophies as the country's Best Radio Drama. De Venecia  also maintains advice columns in Balita and Tempo publications.

De Venecia served as Chairperson of the 2002 Apolinario Mabini Awards that honored the achievements of the disabled; and the 2002 Aliw Awards that gave recognition to outstanding artists.

On January 15, 2004, she inaugurated another project for the CSFI,  The Haven for Children in Muntinlupa, that rehabilitates streetchildren, ages 6 to 12.   In 2006, she expanded this campaign to a national scale by finishing three regional centers for children in Dagupan City, Tarlac City, Prosperidad, Agusan del Sur and Solana, Cagayan.

On December 16, 2004, de Venecia established the INA (Inang Naulila sa Anak) Foundation. Its mission is to provide psycho–social support to grieving mothers who lost their child. INA Healing Center was opened on December 16, 2006, at the DSWD Compound, Batasan Hills, Quezon City.

In 2007, she started her third project as President of the CSFI, The Haven for the Elderly, a 20 building facility for senior citizens in Tanay, Rizal. It was opened on April 28, 2010.

At the same period, The Phase II of The Haven for Women was also constructed.  From its original 9 buildings, it has expanded as a 16-building facility with 2 livelihood centers, an inter-faith chapel, a gym, an administration office, several  residential cottages, an air-conditioned nursery and a sick bay with dental and medical clinics.

Political career
During the May 10, 2010, elections de Venecia won as Congresswoman of the Fourth District of Pangasinan. On January 17, 2011, she was elected as President of the Association of Lady Legislators of the 15th Congress.

Last May 13, 2013, she won her second landslide victory as congresswoman. She asked for reconciliation among victors and vanquished in Pangasinan and thanked the Blessed Virgin Mary of Manaoag for the largely peaceful elections in the province.

Distinctions
De Venecia has received an honorary doctorate degree in humanities from Mindanao State University (2001), Pangasinan State University (2007), Laguna State Polytechnic University (2007) and University of Luzon (2009).  During the International Women's Day celebration on March 7, 2007, de Venecia was the recipient of the Outstanding Humanitarian Service Award from the International Centennial Feminist Association of the Philippines and the Rotary Club of Manila 101.

Projects
The Haven for Women with 15 regional centers.
 The Haven for Children with 4 regional centers.
 The Haven for the Elderly was started in 2007. This 20-building complex in Tanay, Rizal now operates as a refuge for senior citizens.
 Ina Healing Center is located at the DSWD Compound in Batasan Hills, Quezon City. This facility provides free psycho-social support to bereaved mothers who are orphaned by their child.

References

1949 births
Living people
People from Manila
People from Dagupan
Filipino women's rights activists
Nationalist People's Coalition politicians
Members of the House of Representatives of the Philippines from Pangasinan
Women members of the House of Representatives of the Philippines